The RBS 15 (Robotsystem 15) is a long-range fire-and-forget surface-to-surface and air-to-surface anti-ship missile. The later version Mk. III has the ability to attack land targets as well. The missile was developed by the Swedish company Saab Bofors Dynamics.

History
The Swedish Navy earlier made the RB 08 anti-ship missiles with the Halland-class destroyers in the early 1960s.  The main effect of Sweden's defence resolution of 1958 for the Swedish navy was restructuring into a lighter force consisting of fast attack craft (FAC) vessels and a halt to destroyer procurement.  This posed a problem as the existing RB 08 missile required launch rails and a missile magazine in the destroyers, taking up space that was not available in smaller ships. Adding to the problems, each missile had to be individually prepared for launch and only two missiles could be on the launch rails at the same time. In comparison, the P-15 Termit (NATO codename Styx) missile used by the Soviet Union from the late 1950s (which was the expected adversary of RBS 15) stored the missiles in individual containers on deck with the missiles immediately available for launch.  Tests were carried out on Plejad class FACs with a single bow-mounted RB 08 in the late 1960s, but they came to nothing.

Saab's next attempt at anti-ship missiles to equip the Norrköping class FACs of the Swedish navy was in 1978 under the project name "RB 04 Turbo", a development of the air force RB 04E missile with a turbofan engine, changed wing configuration and start rockets to take off from land.  The initial proposal was rejected as inferior to the Harpoon missile.  The project, under the leadership of Hans Ahlinder, then worked out a proposal for a missile with greater capabilities than the Harpoon, and superior performance to the American missile.  To indicate that it was a new weapon the project name was changed from "RB 04 Turbo" to "RBS 15".

The first weapon contract was signed in 1979; at the last minute the Swedish government did not buy the Harpoon anti-ship missile, opting for an indigenous design. The first missiles were delivered to the Navy in June 1984, and the ship version RBS 15 Mk. I was introduced.

The Swedish Navy ordered the missile in 1984 to develop a coastal defense version of the RBS 15F. The missile was taken into Swedish Navy service as the 'Rb 15 by the Swedish Navy and became operational in 1985. The Swedish Air Force received their missiles a couple of years later. The original RBS 15 Mk. I was produced from 1985 to 1990.

Work on a further developed version, the RBS 15 Mk. II, began in the early 1980s, but it took until 1994 to get a development contract for the upgraded anti-ship missile. The Mk. II has the same range (70+ km), but the mid-course and terminal guidance system, as well as the radar and IR signature were upgraded.  The Mk. II has been produced since 1998.

Development of the RBS 15 Mk. III began in the mid-1990s. It is produced by Saab in co-operation with Diehl Defence of Germany. Emphasis was put on increased range (due to larger fuel capacity and new fuel the range has been increased to some 200 km), improved accuracy (integrated GPS) and selectable priority targeting, which improved the weapon system's flexibility. The Mk. III was selected for the German Navy's s. Finnish truck maker Sisu produces missile launch trucks for RBS 15. The Mk. III has been in production since 2004.

In March 2017 Saab received an order for a new generation anti-ship missile to replace the RBS 15, valued at 3.2 billion SEK. The following year, SAAB unveiled the RBS 15 Mk. IV Gungnir, again produced with Diehl. Unlike Mk. III, the Mk. IV Gungnir can be fired from a truck, making it capable of launching from air, sea, or land. Gungnir missiles have been ordered for the Swedish Navy, with the first weapons scheduled for delivery in the mid-2020s.

Development phase
The missile was developed from the RB 04 missile that was used by the Swedish air force. The front of the missile was retained, including the warhead, but the rear received new wings and a turbofan engine replaced the rocket previously used. The RBS 15 underwent trials on the missile FAC  from 1983 and became operational with the Swedish Navy in 1985. The s were to have four vertical missile launch tubes for RBS 15 missiles in an extended hull, canceled due to budget constraints and to not fitting the way Swedish submarines operated.

Versions
 RBS 15 Mk. I Powered by a French Microturbo TRI-60 engine, with a thrust of 3.73 kN (380 khp/830 lbf). Range 70+ km
 RBS 15F An Mk. I adapted for air launch. Entered service in 1989.
 RBS 15 Mk. II  Range 70+ km.  Designed to be launched from a number of different platforms, such as land-based launchers, aircraft, and ships.
 RBS 15SF Mk. II version for Finland. Local designation MTO 85 (Meritorjuntaohjus 1985)
 RBS 15 Mk. III  New turbojet engine Microturbo TRI 60-5 with 4.4 kN (990 lbf) of thrust, range over 200 km, with added land attack capability. New warhead (increased penetration and insensitive munitions qualification) from TDW. There is only a ship launched version. Production started in 2004. New oval launch tubes instead of the old box type.
 RBS 15F ER Aircraft launched version of the Mk. III
 RBS 15SF-3 Finnish-Swedish modernization of the Finnish Mk. IISFs. Finnish designation MTO 85M. Range was increased to over 100 km, the changes further incorporated more waypoints and better ability to overcome obstacles.

 RBS 15 Mk. IV Gungnir
Range , Navigation INS and Anti-Jam GPS, Target seeker J-band active radar, Launchable from air, land and sea

Ordered in March 2017 by Sweden. Has better range, a better seeker and lower weight. It has the ability to knock out a wide range of sea and land targets, all-weather capability and a modular design that allows for future upgrades. To be carried by Visby-class corvettes and JAS Gripen E. Will be delivered between 2017 and 2026 and fully operational in the mid-2020s. RBS 15Mk4 and RBS Mk4 Air was earlier known as RB 15Mk3+ & RB 15F-ER, RBS 15 Gungnir is the system level name

Operators

Current operators

Used by the Algerian National Navy on its two MEKO 200 frigates.

Primary weapon of the Croatian Navy for its five guided missile boats and three coastal systems mounted on Tatra trucks. In total, 48 Mk.I units are in service. Plans for upgrading 21 missiles to a standard incorporating elements from both the Mk.II and the Mk.III versions was cancelled in 2009 due to budget restraints but light software upgrades were continuously executed and have improved the missiles' navigation, precision and electronic defence. The latest of this upgrades was conducted in 2010 as part of usual service works. Unexpectedly though, in August 2014 the Croatian government decided to send at least 20 Croatian RBS 15 missiles through an overhaul program so as to keep them operational and current for another 10 years. The missiles are to receive upgrades to increase their range to about 90–100 km as well as to improve their guidance, precision and survivability against jamming. The missiles were successfully launched and destroyed their targets in live fire naval exercises in 2015, 2016 and 2018.
 
The Finnish Navy operates RBS 15SF-III (Mk. IIs, designation MTO 85) that have undergone various upgrades during their lifetime. The missiles are carried by the s and the s. Finland also operates the missiles from Sisu trucks for mobile coastal defense.
 
The German Navy has chosen the Mk. III to equip its s. Saab has received an order from its German partner Diehl Defence for the RBS 15 anti-ship missile for provision to the German Navy. The order value is approximately 1.7 BSEK with deliveries between 2022 and 2026.
 
The Polish Navy has chosen the Mk. III to equip both its and its upcoming Arrowhead-140PL frigates. The Mk. IV is also under consideration for the frigates.

The Swedish Navy operates the missiles from its, ands. The Swedish Coastal Artillery is also equipped with RBS 15Ms, which are mounted on Scania trucks. Four missile batteries were planned, but in the end only one battery was ever ordered serving from 1995 to 2000 when the coastal artillery was disbanded. The system was reintroduced to service in 2016. The Swedish Air Force operates the RBS 15F.
 
As a part of its Gripen procurement program, the Royal Thai Air Force ordered the air-launch version, the RBS 15F, to equip its Gripen fighter aircraft.

Future operators

In August 2022 the Bulgarian government decided to purchase RBS 15 Mk. III for the two future patrol ships of the Bulgarian navy. The first ship is under construction and will be commissioned in 2025.

Former operators

Some RBS 15s were delivered during the late 1980s for the new Yugoslavian Navy FACs to replace existing Russian-built missiles, but the project was never finalized due to the Croatian War of Independence. Missiles were captured by the Croatian Navy.

See also
 AGM-158C LRASM
 ASM-3
 Babur
 Exocet
 Harpoon
 Kh-35
 Naval Strike Missile
 Neptune
 Otomat
 Sea Eagle
 Type 80 Air-to-Ship Missile
 Type 88 Surface-to-Ship Missile
 Type 90 Ship-to-Ship Missile
 Type 93 Air-to-Ship Missile
 YJ-83

References

External links

 RBS 15 Mk3 Surface-to-Surface Missile (SSM), Sweden
 Manufacturer's page
 GlobalSecurity.org
 German manufacturer's page (site in English) 
 YouTube videoclip of land-based RBS 15
 Flight Global archive, 1973 issue on Anti Ship Missiles
 
 RBS15 Mk3 DIEHL Defence

Anti-ship missiles of Sweden
Surface-to-surface missiles
Weapons of Sweden
Weapons and ammunition introduced in 1985
Bofors
Fire-and-forget weapons